Marcello Violi (born 11 October 1993) is an Italian rugby union player. His usual position is as a Scrum-half, and he currently plays for Valorugby Emilia.

Under contract with Calvisano, for 2014–15 Pro12 season, he named like Permit Player for Zebre in Pro 14.
He played with Zebre from 2015 to 2022.

After playing for Italy Under 20 in 2012 and 2013, in 2014 he also was named in the Emerging Italy squad.

In January 2015, Violi was named in the Italian squad for the 2015 Six Nations Championship.
On 24 August 2015, he was named in the final 31-man squad for the 2015 Rugby World Cup. On the 19 October 2021, he was selected by Alessandro Troncon to be part of an Italy A squad for the 2021 end-of-year rugby union internationals.

References

External links
ESPN Profile
It's Rugby France Profile

1993 births
Living people
Italian rugby union players
Italy international rugby union players
Rugby union scrum-halves
Rugby Calvisano players
Zebre Parma players